Devkota is a surname used by Bahun communities of Nepal. Notable people with the surname include:

 Laxmi Prasad Devkota (1909–1959), Nepali writer
 Bachaspati Devkota, Nepalese communist leader
 Rajeshwor Devkota, Nepalese political leader
 Rishi Devkota, Nepalese communist leader
 Upendra Devkota, Nepalese neurosurgeon
 Dinesh Chandra Devkota, Nepalese Engineer and former Vice-Chairman of National Planning Commission
 Madhav Prasad Devkota, Nepalese writer
 Khim Lal Devkota, Nepalese politician 
 Krishna Jwala Devkota, Nepalese journalist
 Manita Devkota, Miss Universe Nepal 2018 and Top 10 Miss Universe 2018

References

Ethnic groups in Nepal
Bahun
Nepali-language surnames
Surnames of Nepalese origin
Khas surnames